Gamaka (also spelled gamakam) refer to ornamentation that is used in the performance of North and South Indian classical music. Gamaka can be understood as embellishment done on a note or between two notes.  Present-day Carnatic music uses at least fifteen different kinds of
ornamentation. Gamaka is any graceful turn, curve or cornering touch given to a single note or a group of notes, which adds emphasis to each raga's individuality. Gamaka can be understood as any movement done on a note or in between two notes.  The unique character of each raga is given by its gamakas, making their role essential rather than decorative in Indian music. Nearly all Indian musical treatises have a section dedicated to describing, listing and characterising gamakas.

The term gamaka itself means "ornamented note" in Sanskrit. Gamakas involve the variation of pitch of a note, using oscillations or glides between notes. Each raga has specific rules on the types of gamakas that might be applied to specific notes, and the types that may not.

Various commentators on Indian music have mentioned different numbers of gamakas. For example, Sarangadeva describes fifteen gamakas, Narada in Sangeeta Makaranda describes nineteen gamakas, and Haripala in Sangeet Sudhakar describes seven gamakas.

Types of gamakas in Indian music
Tiripa
Sphurita 
Kampita 
Leena
Andolita 
Vali 
Tribhinna 
Kurula
Aahata
Ulhasita 
Humphita 
Mudrita 
Namita 
Plavita 
Mishrita

Carnatic music gamakas
Carnatic music has several ornamentation classes, which can be divided into major groups as shown in the table below. 
These and many more gamakas are mentioned in various treatises and compositions including Arohana (ascending patterns), Avarohana (descending patterns), ahata & pratyahata.

Carnatic ragas can fall under several categories based on their tolerance and dependence on gamakas.  For instance, those like Nayaki, Sahana, Devagandhari, Yadukulakambhodhi etc can never exist without key gamakas like kampita whereas ragas like Keeravani & Shanmukhapriya can sound acceptable with full or partial oscillations. Ragas like Hindola and Revati can be rendered with minimal oscillations.

Hindustani music gamakas
Hindustani music has five gamakas. The gamaka is similar to meend and andolan.

Gamakas in musical notation
Notation for gamakas is generally not found in the Indian music system. There can be considerable difficulty in conveying the complex and fluid melodic movement of gamakas in a notation system that uses fixed pitch signs. In Carnatic music in particular, the notation of gamakas is often unnecessary, as performers use notation as a memory aid for compositions they already learned by hearing and imitating.

However, there are some old scripts and books like the Sangeetha Sampradaya Pradarshini, which have specific signs to indicate the gamakas that have to be used for each note. Usage of such symbols makes it easier to understand the notation and to sing the composition.

Notes

References
 Kassebaum, Gayathri Rajapur. "Karnatak raga" (2000). In

See also
 List of ornaments

Articulations (music)
Ornamentation
Indian classical music
Carnatic music terminology
Hindustani music terminology